Viktor Podloucký (born December 3, 1950) is a Czechoslovak sprint canoer who competed in the mid-1970s. He was eliminated in the semifinals of the K-4 1000 m event at the 1976 Summer Olympics in Montreal.

References
Sports-Reference.com profile

1950 births
Canoeists at the 1976 Summer Olympics
Czechoslovak male canoeists
Living people
Olympic canoeists of Czechoslovakia